The Bestune T77 is a compact CUV produced by the FAW Group under the brand name Bestune.

Overview 

The Bestune compact crossover was first introduced at the Beijing Auto Show in April 2018 as the Bestern T-Concept. The production model debuted at the Guangzhou Auto Show in November of the same year. Since then, the T77 is sold in China. 

The Bestune T77 is the first vehicle marketed by FAW under a new international name "Bestune" instead of "Besturn". The Chinese brand name remains unchanged.

The interior of the Bestune T77 features a holographic assistant called the holographic intelligent control system. The system comes with three characters, and five appearance options for each. The assistant can perform 43 different acts following voice commands.

The Bestune T77 is powered by a 1.2-litre engine developing . The engine is paired with a five-speed manual gearbox or a seven-speed dual-clutch transmission, and is only available as a front-wheel-drive model. The FAW brand in Russia debuted the crossover as the Besturn X60 in Fall 2020.

References

External links

Official website

T77
Cars introduced in 2018
Front-wheel-drive vehicles
Compact sport utility vehicles
Crossover sport utility vehicles
Cars of China